A list of films shot wholly or partly in the Lehigh Valley region of eastern Pennsylvania:

Allentown
List of films shot wholly or partly in Allentown, Pennsylvania:
 Achieving the Perfect 10 (2003)
 Bereavement (2010)
 Executive Suite (1954)
 Glass (2019)
 In Search Of (2008)
 Malevolence (2004)
 Most Valuable Players (2010)
 The Farmer Takes a Wife (1935)
 The Fields (2011)
 Where Angels Go, Trouble Follows (1968)

Bethlehem
List of films shot wholly or partly in Bethlehem, Pennsylvania:
 Brutal Massacre (2007)
 His Prehistoric Past (1914)
 In Search Of (2008)
 Most Valuable Players (2010)
 School Ties (1992)
 The Florentine (1999)
 Transformers: Revenge of the Fallen (2009)

Easton
List of films shot wholly or partly in Easton, Pennsylvania:
 Killian & the Comeback Kids (2020)
 The Florentine (1999)

References

 
Culture of the Lehigh Valley
Films shot in Allentown, Pennsylvania
Lehigh County, Pennsylvania
Lists of films shot in the United States
Lists of television series by setting
Northampton County, Pennsylvania
Pennsylvania-related lists